Loxophlebia nigricornis is a moth of the subfamily Arctiinae. It was described by Rebel in 1901. It is found in Colombia.

References

 Natural History Museum Lepidoptera generic names catalog

Loxophlebia
Moths described in 1901